Mesbah Uddin Ahmed is a Jatiya Party (Ershad) politician and the former Member of Parliament of Rajshahi-2.

Career
Ahmed was elected to parliament from Rajshahi-2 constituency as a Jatiya Party candidate in 1986. He was re-elected in the year 1988.

References

Jatiya Party politicians
Living people
3rd Jatiya Sangsad members
4th Jatiya Sangsad members
Year of birth missing (living people)